This is a list of the Austrian Singles Chart number-one hits of 2002.

See also
2002 in music

References

2002 in Austria
Austria
2002